Burt Ovrut is an American theoretical physicist best known for his work on heterotic string theory. He is currently Professor of Theoretical High Energy Physics at the University of Pennsylvania.

Ovrut earned his Ph.D. in physics at the University of Chicago in 1978. His doctoral advisors were Benjamin W. Lee and Yoichiro Nambu, and his thesis was on an Sp(4) x U(1) Theory of the Weak and Electromagnetic Interactions.

Ovrut is one of those who pioneered the use of M-theory to explain the Big Bang without the presence of a singularity. Together with Justin Khoury, Paul Steinhardt and Neil Turok, he introduced the notion of 
the Ekpyrotic Universe,  "... a cosmological model in which the hot big bang universe is produced by the collision of a brane in the bulk space with a bounding orbifold plane, beginning from an otherwise cold, vacuous, static universe".

Recently Burt Ovrut and his collaborators constructed a Calabi-Yau compactification that reproduces the Minimal Supersymmetric Standard Model without any exotics.
.

References

External links
 Professor Burt Ovrut University of Pennsylvania Home Page
 A discussion of Burt Ovrut's recent work that reproduces the MSSM
 Membrane Theory

Living people
Year of birth missing (living people)
21st-century American physicists
University of Chicago alumni
University of Pennsylvania faculty
American string theorists
Fellows of the American Physical Society